The Slovakia national under-20 football team, controlled by the Slovak Football Association, is Slovakia's national under-20 football team and is considered to be a feeder team for the Slovakia national football team.

Tournament history

FIFA U-20 World Cup

Players

Current squad
 The following players were called up for the friendly matches.
 Match dates: 17, 19 and 21 November 2022
 Opposition: ,  and 
 Caps and goals correct as of:''' 16 November 2022.

See also
 Slovakia national football team
 Czechoslovakia national under-21 football team
 Slovakia national under-21 football team
 Slovakia national under-19 football team
 Slovakia national under-18 football team
 Slovakia national under-17 football team
 Slovakia national under-16 football team
 Slovakia national under-15 football team

References

External links
 Slovak Football Association 

European national under-20 association football teams